Stora Teatern (popularly known as Storan) is a musical theater in the Lorensberg district of Gothenburg, Sweden. Inaugurated in 1859, it is situated in Kungsparken park south of Kungsportsplatsen.

It was originally founded to replace the Segerlindska teatern, and as such was known as Nya Theatern ('New Theatre') until 1880. The thirty-meter-high theater was inaugurated on September 15, 1859. During the first 60 years, this was mainly a dramatic theater featuring opera and operetta. In 1916, Stora Teatern became primarily a lyrical theater.

References

Other sources
Pettersson, Åke (1992)  Teaterliv i Göteborg  (Göteborg: Göteborgs-Posten) 
Persson, Jörgen; Rising Anders (1993) Göteborg bakom fasaderna (Stockholm: Svenska turistfören)  
Rosen, Astrid von (2008) Poul Kanneworff och modernismen på Stora teatern i Göteborg (Göteborg: Göteborgs stadsmuseum)

External links
Stora Teatern website

Theatres in Sweden
Culture in Gothenburg
19th-century establishments in Sweden
Musical theatre